Black Diamond Heavies is a United States blues rock band originating from Nashville, Tennessee.  The band is composed of John Wesley Myers aka Reverend James Leg, formerly of The Immortal Lee County Killers, on bass keys, Fender Rhodes, organ, and vocals with Van Campbell on drums.

Style
After the departure of Mark "Porkchop" Holder, the guitarist, Black Diamond Heavies set out on a venture to take on the blues from a new perspective, with the only instruments being a keyboard and drums.  The self-proclaimed "vagrants/citizens of the world" created a raw, stripped down punk/blues sound, which could be described as dirty or "whiskey-stained". Myers' soulful, "raspy growl" is reminiscent of and has been compared to singer Tom Waits.

History

You Damn Right EP
Black Diamond Heavies formed in 2004 as a three piece band: John Wesley Myers on the keyboard and vocals, Mark "Porkchop" Holder on guitar, harmonica and lead vocals, and Van Campbell on the drums. They soon after started performing and in 2005 the Black Diamond Heavies self-released their first EP, You Damn Right. In 2006 Holder left the band after becoming discouraged with the hardships of life on the road. Myers and Campbell decided to continue the band as a two-man act. Soon after, in the summer of 2006, the band was given a record deal with Alive Records.

Every Damn Time
In 2007, with the band now signed to Alive Records, Black Diamond Heavies released their first studio album, Every Damn Time.

A Touch of Someone Else's Class
In 2008, Black Diamond Heavies released their second studio album under Alive Records, A Touch Of Someone Else's Class. For their second studio album Black Diamond Heavies turned to Dan Auerbach of The Black Keys who produced the album while it was recorded at his Akron Analog Studio.

Alive As Fuck
Since their inception, Black Diamond Heavies have been hyped as great live performers, with their live performances being termed as "both 'Pentecostal' and 'Demon-Possessed'." In 2009 they were able to show the world what the hype was all about, with their first live album, Alive As Fuck, recorded during a gig at the Masonic Lodge, in Covington, KY,. This album was released under the Alive Records label.

Solitary Pleasure
In December 2010 Myers recorded a solo album, Solitary Pleasure, under his pseudonym, James Leg. The album is set to be released on April 5, 2011 under the Alive Records label. Jim Diamond (music producer) of Ghetto Recorders mixed Solitary Pleasure.

Discography
Studio albums

EPs

Live albums

References

Punk blues musical groups
American blues musical groups
Alive Naturalsound Records artists